The Hedge Fund Journal is a monthly magazine focusing on the global hedge fund industry.

Description
The Hedge Fund Journal was formed in 2004 by Publisher Rod Sparks, and is based near Fleet Street, London, UK. The magazine consists of feature articles, original and contributed research, opinion and legal pieces, as well as strategy commentary from hedge fund managers. Its annual features include a ranking of the top 50 European hedge fund managers called The Europe 50, The 50 Leading Women In Hedge Funds, and Tomorrow's Titans. Since 2006, The Hedge Fund Journal has hosted an annual awards ceremony, to recognise the leading service providers to the European hedge fund industry, and expanded its awards franchise to include a UCITS awards ceremony in 2010.

See also 
Trade journal

References

External links 
 Official website
 Financial Times article 
 Financial News article 

Business magazines published in the United Kingdom
Monthly magazines published in the United Kingdom
Hedge funds
Magazines established in 2004